Spectamen gerula is a species of sea snail, a marine gastropod mollusk in the family Solariellidae.

Description
The size of the shell attains 8 mm.

Distribution
This marine species occurs off KwaZuluNatal to the Eastern Cape Province, Rep. South Africa

References

 Herbert D.G. (1987). Revision of the Solariellinae (Mollusca: Prosobranchia: Trochidae) in southern Africa. Annals of the Natal Museum 25(2):283-382

External links
 To World Register of Marine Species
  Herbert D.G. (2015). An annotated catalogue and bibliography of the taxonomy, synonymy and distribution of the Recent Vetigastropoda of South Africa (Mollusca). Zootaxa. 4049(1): 1-98

gerula
Gastropods described in 1987